Angadi is a village in Ranni Taluk, Pathanamthitta district in the state of Kerala, India.

Demographics
At the 2001 census, Angadi had a population of 15,873, with 7,696 males and 8,177 females.

References

Villages in Pathanamthitta district